Sean McTague (born September 6, 2003) is an American professional soccer player who plays as a forward for USL Championship side Orange County.

Club career

Youth
McTague played high school soccer at Junípero Serra Catholic High School, as well as playing club soccer for West Coast FC, before joining the Orange County SC academy. On June 30, 2021, McTague signed an academy contract with Orange County SC's USL Championship team. He made his debut for the club's first team on July 1, 2021, appearing as an injury-time substitute during a 2–0 win over Colorado Springs Switchbacks.

Career statistics

Club

References

2003 births
Living people
People from Mission Viejo, California
American soccer players
Association football forwards
Orange County SC players
USL Championship players
Soccer players from California
Sportspeople from Mission Viejo, California